Cryphia olivacea is a moth of the family Noctuidae first described by Smith in 1891. It is found in North America from British Columbia, south to California.

The wingspan is about 26 mm.

References

Cryphia
Moths of North America
Moths described in 1891